Marathon Airlines, is a Greek airline headquartered in Glyfada, Greece. Its core activities are executive charter services, wet lease and aircraft management services. The airline plans to expand its activities and commence scheduled international services between Athens and Benghazi in March 2023.

Operations 
Marathon Airlines holds a European air operator's certificate (AOC) in Greece and currently operates a fleet of 2 aircraft, and includes private jet charter, aircraft management and Wet Lease (ACMI).

Certificates and Memberships 

 ARGUS Gold Operator
 Wyvern Member
 EBAA Member
 ERA Member
 NBAA Member

Destinations
This list of Marathon Airlines destinations includes the city, country, and the airport's name, with the airline's hub marked.

Fleet
The Marathon Airlines fleet consists of the following aircraft (as of February 2023):

References

External links

Defunct airlines of Greece
Airlines established in 2011
Airlines disestablished in 2015
Heraklion
Greek companies established in 2011